The 2022 Championships of the Small States of Europe was the fourth edition of the biennial competition in outdoor track and field organised by the Athletic Association of Small States of Europe (AASE). It was held on 11 June 2022 at the Matthew Micallef St. John Athletics Stadium in Marsa, Malta. A total of 22 events were contested.

Medal summary

Men

Women

Medal table

Vatican City was also present at the these championships, with two competitors Emiliano Morbidelli and Sara Carnicelli in a "non-scoring" manner. Sara Carnicelli was the third fastest in the women's 5000 m. She was awarded with an honorary bronze medal.

External links
Official site

References

 Results on World Athletics

Championships of the Small States of Europe
Small States of Europe
Athletics in Malta
International sports competitions hosted by Malta
Small States of Europe
Championships of the Small States of Europe